The Forum: Qualitative Social Research (German: Forum Qualitative Sozialforschung) is a triannual peer-reviewed online academic journal covering the theory, methodology, and application of qualitative research. The editor-in-chief has been Katja Mruck (Free University of Berlin) since the journal’s conception. Articles published are in English, German, or Spanish. The journal also incorporates Internet-specific forms of publication such as video and sound recordings.

Indexing and abstracting 
The journal is abstract and indexed by Intute, SocioSite, CSA Sociological Abstracts, CSA Worldwide Political Science Abstracts, International Bibliography of the Social Sciences, Psyndex, Solis, and SocINDEX.

History 
The journal was established in 1999. It has since been developed into an information, communication, and networking portal. The project was initially funded by the Deutsche Forschungsgemeinschaft.

External links

References 

Qualitative research journals
Open access journals
Multilingual journals
Triannual journals
Publications established in 1999
Free University of Berlin
Social research